Nuclear Escalation is a 1983 card game published by Flying Buffalo.

Gameplay
Nuclear Escalation is a sequel to Nuclear War with new special rules and options.

Reception
Scott Haring reviewed Nuclear Escalation in Space Gamer No. 68. Haring commented that "So if you can laugh in the face of potential nuclear conflagration, Nuclear Escalation is not only a cute little game in its own right, but it combined with Nuclear War to produce a killer (pardon the expression) game that is a definite improvement on the original."

Nuclear Escalation was awarded the Charles S. Roberts Award for "Best Science Fiction Boardgame of 1983".

Nuclear Escalation had been the subject of a potential ban on all war related toys when two MPs of the UK Labour Party called the game "a nasty twist on the toy industry".  Rick Loomis was interviewed as part of this discussion saying "the game is intended to be humorous... the subject is so serious that you have to laugh about it because otherwise you'd cry."

Reviews
Dragon #223 (November 1995)
Asimov's Science Fiction v8 n12 (1984 12)
Isaac Asimov's Science Fiction Magazine

References

Card games introduced in 1983
Flying Buffalo games
Origins Award winners